Brasserie du Pêcheur v Germany and R (Factortame) v SS for Transport (No 3) (1996) C-46/93 and C-48/93 is a joined EU law case, concerning state liability for breach of the law in the European Union.

Facts
A French brewery sued the German government for damages for not allowing it to export beer to Germany in late 1981 for failing to comply with the Biersteuergesetz 1952 9 and 10. The Commission viewed this to breach TEEC article 30 and brought infringement proceedings against Germany for prohibiting (1) marketing for products called beer and (2) importing beer with additives. The ECJ had held the prohibition on marketing was incompatible with the Treaties in Commission v Germany (1987) Case 178/84. Brasserie du Pêcheur then claimed DM 1.8m, a fraction of loss incurred.

The BGH said that under BGB § 839, GG Art. 34 for a state be liable it has to have acted wilfully or negligently, and only if a law was written to benefit a third party.

In the joined case, Spanish fishers sued the UK government for compensation over the Merchant Shipping Act 1988. The UK government argued the legislation had been passed in good faith, and did not mean to breach the Treaty provision, so should not therefore be liable.

In his Opinion, Advocate General Tesauro noted that only 8 damages awards had been made up to 1995.

Judgment

Court of Justice
The Court of Justice held that it was irrelevant that Parliament passed the statute, and it was still liable. A prior ruling by the ECJ was also not a precondition for liability. For damages, a law (1) had to be intended to confer rights on individuals (2) sufficiently serious (3) causal link between breach and damage. Member state liability flows from the principle of effectiveness of the law. Member state liability follows the same principles of liability governing the EU itself. In a legislative context, with wide discretion, it must be shown there was a manifest and grave disregard for limits on exercise of discretion.

Bundesgerichtshof
When the Brasserie case returned to the German High Court for Civil Matters (Bundesgerichtshof) then decided the violations were not sufficient to make Germany liable. It stated that is not necessary to prove intention or negligence for liability to be made out.

See also

European Union law

Notes

References

Court of Justice of the European Union case law